The Journal of Anthropological Sciences is an annual peer-reviewed open-access scientific journal covering anthropology. It was established in 1893 as the Atti della Società Romana di Antropologia, and was renamed the Rivista di Antropologia in 1911. In 2003, it was given its current name. According to the Journal Citation Reports, the journal has a 2016 impact factor of 4.000, ranking it 2nd out of 82 journals in the category "Anthropology".

References

External links

Publications established in 1893
Annual journals
Anthropology journals
English-language journals
Academic journals published by learned and professional societies